Joseph Santone (October 1, 1893 – October 27, 1963) was an Italian professional American football guard who played one season for the Hartford Blues of the National Football League (NFL). Santone made two appearances.

Joe Santone was born on October 1, 1893 in Campobasso, Italy. His high school is unknown. Santone did not attend college. In 1926, he made two appearances for the Hartford Blues of the National Football League (NFL) as a guard. His weight was listed at 180, but his height is unknown. He did not make any more appearances after the season as the Blues folded from the league. He later lived in Hartford, Connecticut and died there on October 27, 1963 at the age of 70.

References

1893 births
1963 deaths
American football guards
Hartford Blues players
People from Campobasso
Italian players of American football
Sportspeople from the Province of Campobasso
Italian emigrants to the United States